The Kazakh forest steppe ecoregion (WWF ID: PA0809) is a long thin strip of transition zone between the forested taiga of Siberian Russia (to the north), and the Kazakh steppe to the south. The ecoregion stretches over 2,000 km from the southern Ural mountains in the west to the foothills of Altai mountains in the east, yet averages only 200 km from south to north across its length. Because the region is farther inland than European forest steppe, and some 300 to 500 km farther north, the climate is more continental and with less precipitation the tree cover more sparse. The ecoregion is in the Temperate grasslands, savannas, and shrublands biome, and the Palearctic realm, with a Humid Continental climate.

Location and description 
The ecoregion stretches along the border between Russia and Kazakhstan, mostly on the northern (Russian) side, with a few small sections in Kazakhstan proper.  The terrain is relatively flat lowland plains, with wetlands in the depressions and strips of trees following water courses on the sandy soil.  To the north is the West Siberian taiga ecoregion; to the south is the Kazakh steppe.

Climate 
The climate of the region is Humid continental climate, warm summer (Köppen climate classification (Dfb)). There is just sufficient precipitation (averaging 330 mm/year) to support patchy stands of trees.

Flora and fauna 
The region exhibits the typical forest steppe mix of grasslands and forest too sparse to create a full canopy.  Typical trees are birch, aspen and pine, often growing in small groves called 'kolky', with the pine trees often growing in long strips of sandy soil in formations called 'ribbon forests'.  Swamps are common.  The region was about 15% forested; this has been reduced by human activity.  The most common grass is Calamagrostis epigejos (bushgrass).  A study in 2003 indicated that the small portion of the Kazakh forest steppe that is actually in Kazakhstan (about 21,000 Km2) shows cover that is 13% planted in spring wheat, 37% in dryland cropland/pasture, and 51% in a mosaic of cropland and forest.

Protections 
There are two significant protected areas in the Kazakh forest steppe ecoregion;
 Ilmen Nature Reserve, protecting an area of the Ilmensky Mountains on the southeast of the Ural mountains that has historically been the subject of intense mineral extraction, with over 400 former mines in the borders.
 Tigireksky Nature Reserve, on the far eastern end of the ecoregion, at the foothills of the Altai-Sayan region, and transitioning into mountain-steppe habitats.

See also 
 List of ecoregions in Russia
 List of ecoregions in Kazakhstan

External links

References 

Ecoregions of Russia
Ecoregions of Kazakhstan
Palearctic ecoregions
Temperate grasslands, savannas, and shrublands